The German occupation of Albania occurred between 1943 and 1944 during World War II. Before the armistice between Italy and the Allied armed forces on 8 September 1943, Albania had been in a de jure personal union with and was de facto under the control of the Kingdom of Italy. After the armistice and the Italian exit from the Axis, German military forces entered Albania and it came under German occupation, creating the client-state, the Albanian Kingdom (Albanian: Mbretëria Shqiptare; German: Königreich Albanien).

The Germans favoured the nationalist Balli Kombëtar over King Zog I's Legalists and the occupation was marked by collaboration between them and the Germans. Albania under German occupation retained control of the areas it had received during Italian rule, including most of Kosovo, as well as Western Macedonia, the town of Tutin in Serbia and a strip of Eastern Montenegro. It was the policy of the Balli Kombëtar to have all Albanian populated territories under one state.

History

German invasion and construction of a German Albania

In anticipation of such invasion, the Wehrmacht drew up a series of military plans for action against Italian holdings in the Balkans code-named Konstantin. And for a more direct nature, units of German Military Intelligence (Abwehr) section II were sent to Mitrovica (present day Kosovo) in April 1943 in an attempt to gain some influence among the growing number of Albanians disaffected with the Italians. Even more directly, in July and August 1943, the German army occupied Albanian airports and ports, ostensibly to protect Italian Albania from the possibility of an Allied invasion. By mid-August there were some six thousand German troops in Albania.
The first political move made by the Foreign Ministry prior to the invasion was the appointment of Hermann Neubacher, a former mayor of Vienna, as Ribbentrop's special representative for southeastern Europe. Neubacher, already active in the Balkans as Hitler's representative for economic concerns, would become the key German figure in the Balkans during the second half of the war, although he was not officially assigned Albania as part of his responsibility until 10 September. Apart from the appointment of Neubacher, Major Franz von Scheiger was dispatched to Mitrovica. Scheiger, who had been to Albania before as an officer in the Austro-Hungarian army, was acquainted with many Albanian interwar politicians of influence on a personal basis.

The Germans planned to construct an independent neutral Albania controlled by a government friendly to the Germans. After the Mukje Agreement was broken by the Albanian Partisans, war broke out between the Albanian Partisans (who were backed by the Yugoslav Partisans, who in turn were backed by the Allies) and the Balli Kombëtar.

After the capitulation of Italian forces on 8 September 1943, German troops swiftly occupied Albania with two divisions. The Germans formed a 'neutral government' in Tirana.

An independent state of Albania

The Germans were intent on setting up an autonomous administration and endeavored to persuade Albanian leaders to form a government to take over the administration of the country themselves. Many hesitated, in particular when rumors spread that British forces were preparing to invade Albania. Kosovo Albanian leaders, however, realizing that a German defeat would mean a return to Yugoslav rule, were more willing to cooperate. On 14 September 1943, an Albanian government was then set up under Ibrahim Biçaku of Elbasan, Cafo Beg Ulqini Bedri Pejani and Xhafer Deva of Kosovo. The national assembly, composed of 243 members, began to function on 16 October 1943, electing a four-member High Regency Council (Këshilli i Lartë i Regjencës) to govern the country.

German promises to preserve the 1941 borders of Albania, assurances of "non-interference" with the new Albanian administration and a general Pro-German outlook of most Albanians (dating from the years before and during the First World War where Austro-Hungarian foreign policies were supportive of an independent Albanian state), ensured that the new government initially enjoyed a large amount of support from the people. The new government, which promised to remain neutral in the war, succeeded in restoring a good deal of stability. The administration and justice systems functioned once again, and Albanian schools were reopened throughout northern and central Albania. Steps were also taken to implement a land reform.

The Germans made a genuine effort, often to their own disadvantage, to leave the Albanian people the impression that they possessed at least some level of autonomy. There was no effort to forcibly recruit labour from Albania for the Reich, as it was incompatible with the notion of Albanian independence. The regent Frashëri also came to an agreement with the Germans in February 1944 which stipulated that Albanian prisoners would not be transported out of the country, however the Germans did not always live up to this, particularly towards the end of 1944. In line with Neubacher's policies towards Albania, reprisals on the civilian population for attacks on the German army were uncommon and certainly not as brutal as in other occupied territories.

Frashëri negotiated for as much independence as he could extract from the Germans and was able to convince Neubacher to recognise Albania's "relative" neutrality and "relative" sovereignty. Albania had a status similar to that of Croatia and Slovakia, having relative sovereignty under Nazi Germany. In late November 1943 the Albanian government asked the Germans to help them convince the Kingdom of Bulgaria to extend recognition to the new state; the Germans agreed. At the same time Frasheri began negotiations for the establishment of diplomatic relations with Switzerland and Turkey. This caused some alarm at the German foreign ministry who argued that these neutral states should not be approached, but that states under German control might be asked to extend recognition. Soon after Ante Pavelic's Ustashi regime in Croatia extended their recognition to the Albanians.

Partisan resistance and Civil War

The new government and the Germans had to contend with the increasingly Communist dominated NLM and were subsequently able to coerce much of the nationalist resistance into its camp. The Germans launched a series of offensives against the Partisans, who were primarily concentrated in Southern Albania and to a lesser extent in Central Albania. The first offensive, operation "505", started in early November 1943 to clear Partisan units from the Pezë region and remove the threat to the Durrës-Tirana road. Within eight days the Germans declared the campaign a success having killed some 100 "bandits" and having taken over 1,650 prisoners, all of whom were, by earlier agreement turned over to the Albanian civil authorities. The Balli Kombëtar was also involved in fighting the Partisans during the Winter offensive and by late winter the NLM found itself in considerable difficulty. The NLM came perilously close to being destroyed by the German and Nationalist forces, with the units that managed to escape encirclement suffering from lack of food, clothing and ammunition (as the allies were unable to resupply them from the air). German figures put the number of partisan casualties at 2,239 by the end of January, 401 dead in February and 236 in March. By then all prefectures of the new state, except Gjirokstra in the south, remained in the hands of the Albanian government. Enver Hoxha himself acknowledged that "the situation is difficult".

End of World War II and the beginning of Communism
The success of the Winter campaign proved to be short lived, and the Partisans proved to be much more resilient than the Germans, British and many Albanians had anticipated. With the Grand Alliance established, the Germans began losing the war. With the current situation favouring the communists, the partisans began a full-scale attack on the Germans and Balli Kombëtar. British Liaison officers in Albania noted that the Communists were using the arms they received to fight fellow Albanians far more than to harass the Germans. The west noted that the Communists could not have won without the supplies and armaments from the British, America and Yugoslavia, and that the LNC were not afraid of murdering their country men.

Collaboration

Government

After the Union with Italy was officially dissolved; many of the laws passed after Italian invasion were revoked, and Albania was declared free, neutral and independent. At the same time, the assembly revoked the draft law of June 1940 that declared Albania to be a co-belligerent with Italy. The assembly announced that Albania would be governed by a regency of four, one representative from each of Albania's four major religious communities, for the remainder of the war. The Germans had created a government similar to the one that had ruled after the retreat of Prince Wied in September 1914, demonstrating an appreciation for not only Albanian history but also for Albania's religious makeup.

Lef Nosi was chosen as the Orthodox representative. Representing the Sunni Muslims, the Germans were able to attract Fuat Dibra, a landowner from new Albania who, like Nosi, had a long and distinguished record. Unlike the others, Dibra had served in the collaborationist cabinet of Mustafa Kruja, but in November 1942 he had been elected to the central committee of the Balli Kombëtar and was therefore something of a catch for the Germans, he was replaced by Cafo Beg Ulqini. Albanian Catholics were represented by the prior of the Franciscans in Shkodër, Father Anton Harapi, who maintained connections with both the Kosovars and the Albanian partisans. Learning of his appointment, partisan emissaries unsuccessfully attempted to dissuade him from accepting. Hermann Neubacher seemed to have developed a warm personal relationship with Harapi, in part because Harapi had received some of his education at the monastery school of Meran and Hall in the Tyrol. Mehdi Frashëri, a Bektashi Muslim, was one of the most respected living Albanians. He agreed to head the Council of Regency.

The leadership of the council was originally designed to rotate, but Lef Nosi declined for health reasons and Anton Harapi argued that as a Catholic monk he could accept no position in which he would be forced to sanction the death penalty.

Once committed, the regency moved to form a permanent government, which would begin the process of ending the chaos and stabilizing Albania. Following hurried negotiations, on 5 November, a government headed by the Kosovar, Rexhep Mitrovica was introduced. Mitrovica's cabinet, most of whom had credentials as nationalists as well as some German or Austrian connection, included Xhafer Deva, who had studied at the Robert College of Istanbul and in Vienna, as minister of the interior and Rrok Kolaj, a Catholic from Shkodër who had studied at the University of Graz, as minister of Justice. Austrian educated Vehbi Frasheri was appointed as foreign minister. The Orthodox Elbasaner, Sokrat Dodbiba, the nephew of Lef Nosi, became minister of finance.

Military

In line with the German policy of "non-interference" and a desire to save their own troops for deployment elsewhere an Albanian Army commanded by General Prenk Pervizi was formed soon after the new government was set up. The Germans added to the strength of several units of the regular Albanian army and also increased the effectiveness of the gendarmerie. Many units which had collaborated with the Italians were preserved and subsequently utilised by the Germans in anti-partisan operations, with the staunchly anti-communist Balli Kombetar (National Front) also being used. Soon after the Ballists and German forces pressed hard against the Communists. The Ballists destroyed a fairly large Communist partisan group south-west of Tirana. The partisan force of about 2,000 strong had been annihilated. With other major partisan forces losing, the Albanian Communists tactically retreated, establishing guerrilla warfare to fight the Balli Kombetar. The Ballists, along with the Germans, occupied the region of Chameria (Cham Albanian collaboration with the Axis). The Balli Kombetar forces were subsequently declared to be "co-operating with the Germans, who are exploiting them with arms in large quantities" according to a British Special Operations Executive report from December 1943.

In Kosovo and western Macedonia, when it was a part of the independent state of Albania, the German and Ballist forces had occasional skirmishes with Yugoslav partisans. When Maqellarë, midway between Debar and Peshkopi, was recaptured by the Fifth Partisan Brigade, the Germans with the assistance of the Ballist forces of Xhem Hasa launched an attack from Debar, defeating the partisans. Fiqri Dine, Xhem Hasa and Hysni Dema as well as three German Majors directed military campaigns against the Albanian and Yugoslav partisans. By early November the newly established forces were engaged in fighting Macedonian and Albanian Partisan units in the town of Kicevo. After 7 days of fierce fighting, the Partisans were defeated and forced to retreat from the city. A volunteer militia known as the Vulnetari were also used as frontier guards of the re-organised Albanian state. Fighting in their own local areas (in Kosovo and Macedonia), they fought against both Partisans and Chetniks, "against whom they showed themselves skilled and determined fighters". This unit often carried out cross-border raids in Nedić's Serbia against civilian and military targets. The 21st Waffen Mountain Division of the SS Skanderbeg, established in April 1944, was better known for murdering, raping, and looting in predominantly Serbian areas than for participating in combat operations on behalf of the German war effort.

The Albanian and Yugoslav partisans were the main threat to Albania, but not the only force. In the Sandzak regions that were part of the independent state of Albanian, Chetnik forces harassed the local populace. Džemail Koničanin and Ballist forces under Shaban Polluzha successfully repelled Chetnik forces back from Novi Pazar and crushed their stronghold in Banja.

Police

Xhafer Deva was the Minister of the Interior and therefore the head of the police and gendarmerie in the country. A native Kosovar Albanian and deemed the most "effective and reliable" by the Germans, Deva's forces were involved in targeting the internal enemies of the state. On 4 February 1944, police units under his authority were implicated in the massacre of 86 residents of Tirana suspected of being anti-fascists and other excesses committed by the Gestapo in collaboration with the Albanian gendarmerie. Large number of Serbs were killed across Kosovo or deported to camps in Albania starting from 1942. Local Albanian fighters (Ballists) saw an opportunity to take their revenge upon their Serbian neighbours for the suffering they had endured over previous two decades (Massacres of Albanians in the Balkan Wars, Colonisation of Kosovo). The Ballists attacked the Serb colonists, burning perhaps as many as 30,000 houses belonging to Serb and Montenegrin settlers. Roma (Gypsies) were also targeted by the gendarmerie and police force.

To maintain the military occupation in the new German state of Albania, the Wehrmacht and Waffen SS sought to utilise local manpower to maintain law and order, and fight off Yugoslav Partisan and communist Albanian Resistance activity in the region. For their part Albanian leaders hoped to form an "army, which will be able to safeguard the borders of Kosovo and liberate the surrounding regions". Led by German officers, in May 1944, some troops from the division were stationed in the Gjakova area to guard the mines.

Demographics 

Using Italian estimates from July 1941 the population of the Albanian Kingdom was estimated at 1,850,000. The total population of "old Albania" (encompassing pre 1941 borders) stood at 1,100,000, while "new Albania" (consisting of Kosovo, Debar and parts of Montenegro) was 750,000. The Kingdom consisted of approximately 1,190,000 Muslims (Sunni and Bektashi) and 660,000 Christians (Catholic and Orthodox). The new state consisted of two main minority groups, the Serbs of Kosovo and recent Italian Colonists scattered across Albania.

Economy 

When Germans entered Tirana, they had hoped to find enough money in the national bank to pay their troops. This was to be considered a loan. In actuality, they only found 30million francs. Meanwhile, overhead expenses for the German army in Albania were about 40million francs a month. With some degree of urgency, they turned to the German authorities in Rome, where an SS commando raid had recently captured 120million francs in notes, the plates, 23 sacks of gold coins and 29 cases of gold bars from the main branch of the National Bank of Albania. The gold was sent to Berlin, and the notes were sent to Tirana. The substantial sums were immediately transferred to the National Bank of Albania in Tirana.

The money was used to pay German troops in Albania and Montenegro. It was also used to finance German construction projects such as buildings, roads, road repairs, airports and coastal gun emplacements.

Influences of Nazi Germany
In the Albanian Kingdom, which Nazi Germany formally treated as a sovereign state, much of the industrial and economic activity was either monopolised, or given a high priority for exploitation, by Germany. Almost all of the export companies operating were managed by the Germans, and mostly by the German military. The chrome ore, magnesite and lignite mines and the oilfields present across Albania were under direct German control.

The most important ore reserves for the Wehrmacht in Albania were chrome ore. Chrome was found both in Old Albania and in Kosovo. In the former, there were chrome ore deposits in Kukës, Klos and Pogradec. When the Germans entered the Kosovo region, there were functioning chrome mines in Gjakova and Letaj. From October 1943 to the end of August 1944 a total of 42,902 tons of chrome were extracted from these mines, of which 28,832 tons were exported to Germany. Magnesite mines in Golesh were also of significance. From mid September 1943 to the end of August 1944 an amount equalling 2,647 tons of processed and unprocessed Magnesite were exported to Germany.  Aside from Romania, Albania was the only country in southeastern Europe that had substantial oil reserves. In Devoll roughly one million tons of crude oil were processed after the oilfields were up and running by May 1944.

Currency
The currency that was used during the German occupation was the Albanian Gold Franga.

See also 
21st Waffen Mountain Division of the SS Skanderbeg (1st Albanian)
Albanian Resistance of World War II
National Liberation Movement (Albania)
The Holocaust in Albania

Notes

Sources

 
 

 
Client states of Nazi Germany
World War II occupied territories
States and territories established in 1943
States and territories disestablished in 1944
1943 establishments in Albania
1944 disestablishments in Albania
1940s in Kosovo
Collaboration with Nazi Germany